Gymnanthes lucida, commonly known as shiny oysterwood or crabwood, is a species of flowering plant in the spurge family, Euphorbiaceae, that is native to southern Florida in the United States, the Bahamas, the Caribbean, Mexico, and Central America.

Description

References

Hippomaneae
Trees of the Southeastern United States
Trees of the Caribbean
Trees of Mexico
Trees of Central America
Taxa named by Olof Swartz